Awaken Reloaded is the reissue of American singer Keke Palmer's debut mixtape Awaken (2011).

Background and composition 
The maturity of the songs on the mixtape shows how Keke has grown. It was released on August 22, 2011.

Singles 
"The Greatest" was released on July 12, 2011 as the first single from the mixtape. A preview for the song was premiered via Palmer's YouTube channel on June 28, 2011. The song was also appears on the premiere of the eleventh season of Degrassi.

The solo version of "Walls Come Down" was released as second single for streaming on July 11, 2011 and was later released to iTunes on July 12, 2011.

Track listing

References

Keke Palmer albums
2011 mixtape albums